Marcus Daniell and Marcelo Demoliner were the defending champions, but played with different partners. Daniell partnered Dennis Novikov while Demoliner played with Aisam-ul-Haq Qureshi. Daniell lost in the first round to Johan Brunström and Andreas Siljeström. Demoliner also failed to defend his title, losing in the final to Wesley Koolhof and Matwé Middelkoop 7–6(7–5), 0–6, [10–8].

Seeds

Draw

References
 Main Draw

Aegon Ilkley Trophy - Doubles
2016 Men's Doubles